

The Robert Masterson House is located in Marion County, Missouri and was first built around 1830 by Robert Masterson. It was listed on the National Register of Historic Places.

Structure
The Robert Masterson House is a significant regional example of an early Georgian cottage floor plan rare in Missouri. The house is constructed of native limestone and faces roughly East from a rolling upland near an ever-flowing spring. It is located some three miles west of the Mississippi River bottom and five miles northwest of Hannibal, Missouri, several miles southeast of Palmyra, Missouri. Most of the original structure and interior woodwork still exist. The dwelling is two rooms deep and consists of a file of two rooms on either side of a central hallway, with four small attic rooms separated by a hall above. Robert Masterson (1791-1864), a veteran of the War of 1812 and the builder of the house, played an important role in the early settlement of the area. The Masterson house is likely the oldest surviving dwelling in Marion County and one of the oldest in Northeast Missouri.

Ownership
The Robert Masterson House was restored in the 1990s and is currently privately owned.

Gallery

References 

Houses on the National Register of Historic Places in Missouri
Houses completed in 1840
Houses in Marion County, Missouri
National Register of Historic Places in Marion County, Missouri